The Wankaner–Surendranagar section belongs to Western Railway of Rajkot Division in Gujarat State.

History
Sir Lakhdiraji, who ruled from 1922 until 1948. Sir Lakhdiraji acted as a ruler, manager, patron and policeman of the state with great authority. Sir Lakhdiraji, like other contemporary rulers of Saurashtra, built roads and a railway network (of seventy miles), connecting Wadhwan and Morbi. Surendranagar-Rajkot section was laid in 1890. Gauge conversion of Viramgam–Hapa section via Surendranagar, Wankaner was completed by 1980. Morvi State Railway was merged into the Western Railway on 5 November 1951.

Freight
About 26 trains pass through this section daily.

Doubling 
Doubling work on this section is expected to be commenced by December 2016.

References

5 ft 6 in gauge railways in India
Railway lines in Gujarat

1890 establishments in India